Ebersbach-Neugersdorf is a town in the district of Görlitz, in Saxony, Germany. It is situated on the border with the Czech Republic, just across from the Czech town of Jiříkov. It was formed on 1 January 2011 by the merger of the former municipalities of Ebersbach and Neugersdorf.

References 

 
Towns in Görlitz (district)